The Wilde Kreuzspitze (Italian: Picco della Croce) is a mountain in the Zillertal Alps in South Tyrol, Italy.

References 

 Dieter Seibert: Leichte 3000er, Bruckmann Verlag, München 2001. 
 H. Klier und W. Klier: Alpenvereinsführer Zillertaler Alpen, München 1990,

External links 

Mountains of the Alps
Mountains of South Tyrol
Alpine three-thousanders
Zillertal Alps